Line 9 is a southwest-northeast line of the Shanghai Metro network. The line is colored light blue on system maps.

History
In the initial planning of Line 9, the entire line was from Fengjing to Chongming Island. Later, the plan to extend to Fengjing was cancelled, and the section to Chongming Island was changed to Chongming line.

It uses the Bombardier Movia trains which were lended to line 1.

Line 9 did not directly connect to the rest of the Shanghai Metro network until the opening of the Line 9 portion of the  station on December 28, 2008. The station is an interchange between lines 3 and 4. A shuttle bus conveyed passengers between Guilin Road and Yishan Road stations until construction was completed.

On April 7, 2010, the extension to Middle Yanggao Road Station was completed.

On December 30, 2012, the extension from Songjiang New City to Songjiang South Railway Station was opened.

On December 30, 2017, the line's east extension, consisting of 9 stations from Middle Yanggao Road to Caolu, entered operation.

<onlyinclude>

Stations

Service routes

Important stations
- the collection of several top universities in Shanghai, including Donghua University, Shanghai International Studies University, East China University of Politics and Law, Shanghai Institute of Foreign Trade are located there.
 - serving Sheshan Hill, a tourist and pilgrimage destination with the Sheshan Observatory and the Sheshan Basilica.
 - serving the old town of Qibao.
 - serving the high-tech park Caohejing.
 - one of the busiest metro stations in Shanghai, with shopping malls and office buildings in the vicinity; interchange with lines 1 and 11.
 - a major interchange station on four lines - Interchange with lines 2, 4 and 6.

Future expansion
The east section is planned to extend one station to Caolu Railway station.

Station name change
 On 28 October 2006, Dongfang Road was renamed as the  after station renovation for line 2 and the opening of Line line 4 (before line 9 began serving the station).

Headways
<onlyinclude>

Technology

Rolling Stock

Former Rolling Stock

One car (0952) manufactured in 2007 was mainly debugged for experimental purposes. It began trial operation with passengers on April 25, 2009, and will no longer be online in 2010. On December 20, 2011, the vehicle was retired from line 9 and became a special training vehicle. It was transferred to the original  of line 2 to the newly built  training line for subway staff training.

References

Shanghai Metro lines
 
Railway lines opened in 2007
2007 establishments in China